Catherine E. Harnois is an American quantitative sociologist whose research is rooted in multiracial feminist theory. Her focuses include how social science practices can obscure diversity and reproduce social inequalities; intersectional discrimination; and the relation between social identities and political consciousness. She is Professor and Chair of the Department of Sociology at Wake Forest University.

In 2012, she received the Outstanding Contribution to Scholarship Article Award from the American Sociological Association Section on Race, Gender, and Class.

Select publications

References

External links 

21st-century social scientists
Feminist theorists
Living people
Year of birth missing (living people)